Nygaard, Nygård, or Nygard are surnames of Scandinavian origin.  The name means "new homestead", "new farm" or "new garden". Notable people with the surname include:

Agnes Nygaard Haug, Norwegian judge
Anne-Pia Nygård, Norwegian writer
Arne Nygaard (b. 1957), Norwegian organizational theorist
Arne Nygård-Nilssen, Norwegian art historian, publicist, and magazine editor
Camilla Martin Nygaard, Danish badminton player
Damien Nygaard, Australian football player
Eldon Nygaard, Democratic member of the South Dakota House of Representatives
Eline Nygaard Riisnæs, Norwegian pianist and musicologist at the University of Oslo 
Gulborg Nygaard, Norwegian politician for the Liberal Party
Gunhild Nygaard, Norwegian fashion designer
Gunnar Nygaard (broadcaster) (1897–1997), Norwegian radio broadcaster
Gunnar Nygaard (phycologist) (1903–2002), Danish phycologist
Hjalmar Nygaard (boxer), Norwegian boxer who competed in the 1920 Summer Olympics
Hjalmar Carl Nygaard (1906–1963), United States Representative from North Dakota
Jeff Nygaard, American beach volleyball player
Jens Nygaard, American orchestra conductor
Jens Nygård, Finnish footballer
Jorun Askersrud Nygaard, Norwegian cross country skier and athlete during the 1950s
Karl Emil Nygard, American communist politician
Kristen Nygaard, Norwegian computer programming pioneer and politician
Kristen Nygaard (footballer), Danish football (soccer) player
Lester Nygaard, a fictional character (portrayed by Martin Freeman) in Season 1 of the FX television series Fargo
Marc Nygaard, Danish football (soccer) player
Marius Nygaard (academic) (1838–1912), Norwegian educator and linguist
Marius Nygaard (judge), Norwegian judge
Mathias Nygård, also known as "Warlord Nygård," vocalist of Finnish folk metal band Turisas
Nils Nygaard, Norwegian law professor
Oddvar Nygaard (1919–1985), Norwegian accordionist and composer
Olav Nygard, Norwegian poet
Peter Nygård, Finnish-Canadian fashion executive
Petri Nygård, Finnish rap artist
Rainer Nygård, Finnish guitar player
Roger Nygard, American film director and producer
Richard Lowell Nygaard, United States federal judge
Safiya Nygaard, American YouTuber
Trygve Nygaard, Norwegian football (soccer) player
Vanessa Nygaard, American basketball player and coach
William Nygaard, retired head of the Norwegian publishing company Aschehoug
William Martin Nygaard (1865–1952), Norwegian publisher and politician
Åse Nygård Pedersen, a Norwegian handball player

See also
Johan Nygaardsvold, Norwegian politician

Danish-language surnames
Norwegian-language surnames
Swedish-language surnames